Port Chester station is a commuter rail stop on the Metro-North Railroad's New Haven Line, located in Port Chester, New York. The station is the northernmost station on the line in New York before crossing into Connecticut.

History

Though the New York and New Haven Railroad laid tracks through Port Chester in the late-1840s, the current station house was built in 1890 by the New York, New Haven, and Hartford Railroad. Between 1929 and 1937 it was located across Westchester Avenue from the terminal station of the Port Chester Branch of the New York, Westchester and Boston Railway. Today that former station is the home of the Girtman Memorial Church of the Living God.

As with all New Haven Line stations in Westchester County, the station became a Penn Central station upon acquisition by Penn Central in 1969, and eventually became part of the MTA's Metro-North Railroad in 1983. A restoration project was carried out in 2009. In late 2017 an elevator was opened on the Westchester Avenue side of the station for access to the Northbound platform. The station hosts a restaurant which as of 2018 includes pizza, as well as other food, baked in a coal-fired oven, and a beer garden.

Under the 2015–2019 Metropolitan Transportation Authority Capital Plan, the station, along with four other Metro-North Railroad stations, received a complete overhaul as part of the Enhanced Station Initiative. Updates included cellular service, Wi-Fi, USB charging stations, interactive service advisories, and maps. The renovations at Port Chester station cost $13.2 million and were completed by the end of February 2019.

Station layout
The station has two high-level side platforms each 10 cars long.

As of August 2006, weekday commuter ridership was 2,263 and there are 859 parking spots.

Bibliography

References

External links

May 28, 1999 Walter Hahn Photo (Existing Railroad Stations in Westchester County, New York)
 Westchester Avenue entrance from Google Maps Street View
 King Street entrance from Google Maps Street View

Metro-North Railroad stations in New York (state)
Stations on the Northeast Corridor
Stations along New York, New Haven and Hartford Railroad lines
Port Chester, New York
Railway stations in Westchester County, New York
Railway stations in the United States opened in 1848
1849 establishments in New York (state)